Carlos Luis Zbinden Brito (born 2 December 1976) is a retired Chilean athlete who specialised in the 400 metres and 400 metres hurdles. He represented his country at the 2000 Summer Olympics without advancing to the semifinals.

His personal best in the event is 49.72 seconds, set in Alcorcón in 1998, a former national record.

Competition record

References

External links
 ENTRENA CON CARLOS ZBINDEN EN SU NUEVO EQUIPO 

1976 births
Living people
Chilean male hurdlers
Athletes (track and field) at the 2000 Summer Olympics
Olympic athletes of Chile
Athletes (track and field) at the 1999 Pan American Games
South American Games silver medalists for Chile
South American Games medalists in athletics
Competitors at the 1998 South American Games
Pan American Games competitors for Chile
Competitors at the 1997 Summer Universiade